Staňkovice is a municipality and village in Louny District in the Ústí nad Labem Region of the Czech Republic. It has about 1,100 inhabitants.

Administrative parts
The village of Selibice and the area of the industrial zone called Staňkovice Průmyslová zóna Triangle are administrative parts of Staňkovice.

References

Villages in Louny District